Faustabryna mindanaoensis is a species of beetle in the family Cerambycidae. It was described by Stephan von Breuning in 1980, originally under the genus Callimetopus. It is known from the Philippines.

References

Pteropliini
Beetles described in 1980